Orkhon Aimag is one of the 21 Aimags (provinces) of Mongolia, located in the north of the country. Its capital is Erdenet. The province is named after Orkhon River.
This Aimag was cut out of Bulgan Aimag in 1994, to form a new entity together with its capital Erdenet, which had previously been administered as a federal municipality.

Administrative subdivisions 

* - includes aimag capital Erdenet

References 
 
 

 
Provinces of Mongolia
States and territories established in 1994
1994 establishments in Mongolia